Wang Yunmin (born October 1955) is a Chinese engineer and formerly served as president of Sinosteel Ma'anshan Institute of Mining Research Co., Ltd..

Biography
Wang was born in Dangshan County, Anhui, in October 1955. After the resumption of National College Entrance Examination, he enrolled at Jiangxi University of Science and Technology. After graduating in 1982, he was offered a position at Ma'anshan Mine Research Institute.

Honours and awards
 June 2012 Guanghua Engineering Technology Award
 November 22, 2019 Member of the Chinese Academy of Engineering (CAE)

References

1955 births
Living people
People from Dangshan County
Engineers from Anhui
Jiangxi University of Science and Technology alumni
Members of the Chinese Academy of Engineering